One Nurse At A Time (ONAAT) is a 501(c)(3) nonprofit organization created by nurses who are passionate about giving back to their local and global community through volunteer and humanitarian medical pursuits. One Nurse At A Time is dedicated to supporting and encouraging nurses as they seek opportunities to serve locally, nationally, or internationally.

Based in Seattle, Washington, ONAAT was created in 2007 by two local nurses, Sue Averill and Staci Kelley. ONAAT is a private, volunteer staffed, nonsectarian, nonpolitical organization.

One Nurse At A Time is dissolving as of April 30, 2023.  We thank all our partners, donors and nurses who have given so much to change the world.  We are proud of our accomplishments and hope the spirit of volunteering will continue as our lasting legacy.

Activities
One Nurse At A Time helps nurses volunteer their skills to those in need in several ways. They offer scholarships up to $1,000 to offset the cost of medical missions, a program that has allowed dozens of volunteers to serve all over the world since the organization was founded. ONAAT also maintains a searchable directory of organizations offering volunteer opportunities for nurses in the US and abroad. Their website offers education modules to help nurses understand unfamiliar global disease processes, and they share humanitarian nursing stories on their blog.

One Nurse At A Time also actively supports first-mission nurses via the Jo's Nurses program. Named for Marilyn Jo Schuyler, an early supported of ONAAT, Jo's Nurses is a medical mission program for nurses who have never volunteered abroad but want to begin to incorporate volunteering into their careers. Small groups of first-mission nurses travel with a mentor from One Nurse At A Time through selected organizations from the One Nurse directory.  ONAAT provides these nurses with pre-trip orientation and training, financial support, and hands-on supervision.  Jo's Nurses participants commit to at least one additional volunteer mission the year following their Jo's Nurses experience.

Public education about the depth and breadth of humanitarian nursing is another major focus of the organization's work.  ONAAT nurses speak at public forums, maintain an active presence on internet social networks, and write articles and stories about their experiences.

In 2016 One Nurse At A Time published the first in a series of books about humanitarian nurses:  One Nurse At A Time:  Beyond Borders

Leadership
Founder Sue Averill, RN, serves as an unpaid officer for the organization as President and Treasurer. Both Averill and co-founder Staci Kelley are emergency room nurses in the Seattle area, and have volunteered part-time, locally and abroad, with organizations such as Doctors Without Borders, Public Health Reserve Corps, and many others. Averill received NurseWeek's Nursing Excellence award in 2012 for Volunteerism and Service, and was nominated for Nurse of the Year 2010 by the March of Dimes. 2010 - 2012 ONAAT added Nancy Leigh Harless, BSN, WCHNP, as Communications Director to increase public awareness of ONAAT through the media.

The unpaid Board of Directors are members in and outside the medical community, and guide the organization in activities and future programs.

References

9.  One Nurse At A Time: Beyond Borders edited by Sue Averill.  Humanitarian Nursing at the Edge of the World

External links
 

Nursing organizations in the United States
Medical and health organizations based in Washington (state)